USS Aaron Ward may refer to the following ships of the United States Navy:

, a destroyer that served between 1919 and 1940 and then became HMS Castleton.
, a destroyer that served between 1942 and her sinking by Japanese bombers in 1943.
, a destroyer minelayer that served in 1944 and 1945.

See also
 , named after James Harmon Ward, which fired the first American shot of World War II at the entrance to Pearl Harbor on 7 December 1941.

United States Navy ship names